Makary may refer to:

Africa
 Makary, Cameroon, a town in Far North Region, Cameroon, on Lake Chad
 Makary people, the Kotoko of the Lake Chad region, descended from the Kotoko kingdom

Slavic name
"Makary", also "Makari", is a Slavic name, cognate with the Latin Macarius:
 Macarius of Unzha (1349–1444)
 Macarius, Metropolitan of Moscow (1482–1563)
 Macarius Bulgakov (1816–1882)
 Macarius II (disambiguation)

See also
 Makari (disambiguation)